The 1947 Swiss Grand Prix was a Grand Prix motor race held at Bremgarten on 8 June 1947.

Classification

Heat 1

Drivers in bold advanced to the final

 Pole position : Carlo Felice Trossi, 2:42.9
 Fastest lap : Achille Varzi, 3:02.3

Heat 2

Drivers in bold advanced to the final

 Pole position : Jean-Pierre Wimille, 2:47.9
 Fastest lap : Raymond Sommer, 2:46.6

Final

Swiss Grand Prix
Swiss Grand Prix
Grand Prix